Darwinia procera  is a plant in the myrtle family Myrtaceae and is endemic to a small area in New South Wales. It is a shrub with laterally compressed leaves, so that they are thicker than wide. The flowers are reddish-purple and arranged in groups of four near the ends of the branches. Although rare in nature, this species is often grown by native plant enthusiasts.

Description
The leaves are laterally compressed and arranged in a decussate pattern along the branches.

Flowering occurs between late winter and early summer.

Taxonomy
Darwinia procera was first formally described in 1962 by Barbara Briggs in Contributions from the New South Wales National Herbarium from specimens she collected near Kariong in 1961. The specific epithet (procera) is derived a Latin word meaning "tall", "slender" or "long", possibly referring to the growth habit of the plant.

Distribution and habitat
This darwinia grows in forest and scrub near the top of sandstone gullies on the central coast north of Sydney.

Conservation
Darwinia procera is a rare plant but is not considered to be in danger at present. A significant population is preserved in the Brisbane Water National Park.

Use in horticulture
Darwinia procera is reasonably well-known in horticulture with its unusual foliage being a feature. It can be propagated from seed but is easier to raise from cuttings. It is hardy in well-drained, sandy soil in a partly-shaded situation with occasional watering in long dry spells.

References

Flora of New South Wales
Myrtales of Australia
procera
Plants described in 1962
Taxa named by Barbara G. Briggs